Daram Khola-A Hydropower Station is a run-of-the-river hydroelectricity plant located in Baglung District of Nepal. The flow from Daram River is used to generate 2.5 MW electricity.

Location and hydrology

The Daram Khola-A Hydropower Station is on the Daram Khola (Daram River).
Two other projects on the river were under construction in 2020, the 3 MW mid-Daram A and 4.5 MW mid-Daram B.

The weir of the hydroelectric project is in the Hila and Argal village development committees of the Baglung District.
The powerhouse is in Argal VDC on the left bank of the Daram Khola.

Technical

Headworks structures include a weir across the river, intake, desander, gravel trap, surge tank/forebay and spill-way.
From the headworks a  penstock pipe with diameter  carries water to the powerhouse.
The surface powerhouse has two horizontal Francis turbines with rated discharge of  feeding synchronous 3-phase generators with rated output of 1350 KW each.

Construction

Design of the project was undertaken by Innovative Engineering Services (IES) of Nepal under contract to Dhaulagiri Civil Electrical Mechanical Engineering.
The Initial Environmental Examination report for the project was submitted for approval to the Department of Electricity Development on 23 February 2012.
In December 2012 it was reported that construction had begun and was expected to cost Rs. 460 million and to take two years.
Commercial production of electricity began on 26 May 2016.

Finance

The plant is owned and developed by Sayapatri Hydropower Pvt. Ltd., an Independent Power Producer of Nepal. The plant started generating electricity from 2073-03-12BS. The generation licence will expire in 2105-02-01 BS, after which the plant will be handed over to the government. The power station is connected to the national grid and the electricity is sold to Nepal Electricity Authority. The company is going to Issue IPO to raise fund  . The company has appoint Laxmi capital as issue manager .

See also

List of power stations in Nepal

References

Sources

Hydroelectric power stations in Nepal
Gravity dams
Run-of-the-river power stations
Dams in Nepal
Irrigation in Nepal
2016 establishments in Nepal
Buildings and structures in Baglung District